Do Ab (also Romanized as Do Āb, Dow Āb, and Dūāb) is a village in Hendudur Rural District, Sarband District, Shazand County, Markazi Province, Iran. At the 2006 census, its population was 37, in 12 families.

References 

Populated places in Shazand County